The 2015–16 Eastern Kentucky Colonels basketball team represented Eastern Kentucky University during the 2015–16 NCAA Division I men's basketball season. The Colonels, led by first year head coach Dan McHale, played their home games at McBrayer Arena within Alumni Coliseum and were members of the East Division of the Ohio Valley Conference. They finished the season 15–16, 6–10 in OVC play to finish in fourth place in the East Division. They failed to qualify for the OVC tournament.

Roster

Schedule

|-
!colspan=9 style="background:#7A0019; color:#FFFFFF;"| Exhibition

|-
!colspan=9 style="background:#7A0019; color:#FFFFFF;"| Regular season

|-
!colspan=9 style="background:#7A0019; color:#FFFFFF;"| Ohio Valley Conference regular season

References

Eastern Kentucky Colonels men's basketball seasons
Eastern Kentucky